Mypadu is a village in Indukurupeta Mandal of Nellore district in the state of Andhra Pradesh, India. This is located at 25 Kilometers from Nellore City. The beach here is a tourism spot and many people visit this during holidays and weekends

Geography
Maipadu's geographical coordinates are 14° 30' 0" North, 80° 10' 0" East and its original name (with diacritics) is Maipādu

See also 
Mypadu Beach

References

External links

Andhra Pradesh State Tourism Hotels in Maipadu

Villages in Nellore district
Beaches of Andhra Pradesh